Serhiy Ivanovych Melnyk (born 22 February 1965) is a Ukrainian politician who served as a People's Deputy of Ukraine in the 8th Ukrainian Verkhovna Rada.

Biography
Serhiy Melnyk was born in the village of Molomolyntsi in rural Khmelnytskyi Raion, Khmelnytskyi Oblast, Ukraine. In the period from 1981 to 1984 he was studying at Khmelnytskyi cooperative technical school, since 1984 — at Khmelnytskyi technological Institute which he graduated from in 1990 on specialty «Book keeping and analysis of economic activity». In 1984–1986 he served in the army, after which he continued his studies at Khmelnytsky Technological Institute. From 1990 to 1992 he worked as an economist of plan-finances department at Khmelnytskyi Regional Housing Communal Administration. From 1992 to 1993 he was a leading book-keeper at the Administration of Housing-communal household of Khmelnytsky Oblast State Administration. 

In 1994 he took the post of the Vice-head of the Financial Department  — the Head of Economic Analysis and Planning Department of Khmelnytskyi City Executive Committee. In 1998 he was appointed the Vice-head of Khmelnytsky's Major on the issues of executive power body activity — the Head of Financial Department. Since 2000 he works as the Head of Home Finances Department. Since July 2002 he takes the post of the Head of the Department on Budget of the Ministry of Finance. The same year he was appointed as the Head of The Main Financial Administration of Khmelnytskyi Oblast Administration, in 2003 he became the Vice-head of Khmelnytskyi Oblast State Administration. In July 2006 he was elected Mayor of Khmelnytskyi and he was reelected in October 2010. 

In the 2014 Ukrainian parliamentary election Melnyk was elected a People's Deputy of Ukraine of the VIII convocation. Melnyk was an independent candidate in single-mandate constituency 187 (located in Khmelnytskyi). He won the election there with 33.76% of the vote. Runner up Vitalii Movchan of Petro Poroshenko Bloc gained 18.19%. In parliament he took the post of the Vice-head of the Committee of the Verkhovna Rada on issues of budget. And he became a member of the faction of Petro Poroshenko Bloc "Solidarity".

In the 2019 Ukrainian parliamentary election Melnyk again as an independent candidate competed unsuccessfully for reelection (again) in single-mandate constituency 187. He lost this election to winner Mykola Stefanchuk who won single-mandate constituency 187 for Servant of the People with 35.83% of the votes. Runner up Vitalii Didenko from Svoboda gained 29.44% and Melnyk finished third with 7.33%.

Awards and Honours
 In 2006 was awarded the Order of Equal-to-the-Apostles Knight Volodymyr,  III class.
 In accordance with Ukraine's President's decree in 2007 he was awarded the honour of «Merited Economist of Ukraine».
 On 21 November 2014, in accordance with a decision of Khmelnytskyi City Council he was awarded the certificate of Merit of Khmelnytskyi City Council,  І class .
 22 January 2019 Ukraine's Order of Merit, II class,№14/2019.

Notes

External link

1965 births
Living people
People from Khmelnytskyi Oblast
Independent politicians in Ukraine
Petro Poroshenko Bloc politicians
Solidarity Party (Ukraine) politicians
Recipients of the Order of Merit (Ukraine), 3rd class
Eighth convocation members of the Verkhovna Rada